Jiří Suchý (born 1 October 1931) is a Czech actor and writer. He also writes music. Currently he is the owner of the theatre Semafor in Prague where he has performed for many years and which he helped to establish in 1959.

See also
Tante Cose da Veder with Petr Hapka, Michal Horáček & Ondřej Brzobohatý

References

External links
 

1931 births
Living people
Actors from Plzeň
20th-century Czech dramatists and playwrights
20th-century Czech poets
Czech male dramatists and playwrights
Czech male poets
Czech male stage actors
Czech male film actors
Czech songwriters
Recipients of Medal of Merit (Czech Republic)
Recipients of the Order of Tomáš Garrigue Masaryk
Recipients of the Thalia Award